Velvet Smooth is a 1976 American blaxploitation film directed by Michael L. Fink and starring Johnnie Hill. The screenplay concerns a crime lord who hires a female private detective to find out who's stealing his business. This was the only film role for Hill and co-star Emerson Boozer who had played for the New York Jets (1966–1975).

Plot
Somebody's running a takeover on crime lord King Lathrop's (Owen Watson) operation using bogarts in Hannibal Lecter lookalike masks. Clueless, King Lathrop calls private detective Velvet Smooth (Johnnie Hill) for help. With the help of her friends Ria (Elsie Roman), a lawyer, and Frankie (René Van Clief), she infiltrates the criminal underworld to investigate.

Velvet finds this may be an inside job led by King Lathrop's man Calvin (James Durrah). When Velvet reports this to Lathrop, he denies it at first but the problems come closer to Calvin. Hurt by it all, Lathrop fires Calvin. Although Lathrop thinks Calvin masterminded the take-over on his own, Velvet remains unconvinced and seeks further to find out who was the man behind the man.

See also
 List of blaxploitation films

External links 

Girls With Guns review

1976 films
Blaxploitation films
1970s crime films
American detective films
1970s English-language films
1970s American films